Jiří Valta (born 27 November 1972) is a retired Czech football midfielder.

References

1972 births
Living people
Czech footballers
FC Hradec Králové players
AFK Atlantic Lázně Bohdaneč players
FC Fastav Zlín players
FK Pardubice players
Czechoslovak First League players
Czech First League players
Association football midfielders